This article is a list of military conflicts involving Togo.

References

Military history of Togo
Wars
Wars involving Togo